Rosnel is a railway point and unincorporated place on the south side of Botsford Lake on the Marchington River in Unorganized Kenora District in northwestern Ontario, Canada.

It lies on the Canadian National Railway transcontinental main line, between Superior Junction to the west and McDougall Mills to the east, has a passing track, and is passed but not served by Via Rail transcontinental Canadian trains.

References

Communities in Kenora District